Chitalmari is an upazila of Bagerhat District in the Khulna Division, Bangladesh.

Geography
It has 24,306 households and a total area of 192 km2. Chitalmari Upazila is bounded by Tungipara Upazila on the north, Kachua Upazila and Bagerhat Sadar Upazila on the south, Nazirpur Upazila on the east, and Mollahat Upazila and Fakirhat Upazila on the west. Lakkhanar Beel, Kalshirar Beel and Ruiar Beel are notable. The main rivers are the Madhumati, and last north village Paranpur,  Kaliganga, Chitra, and Baleshwar rivers.

Demographics
As of the 1991 Bangladesh census, Chitalmari has a population of 127,524. Males constitute 50.78% of the population, and females 49.22%. This Upazila's eighteen-and-up population is 65,065. Chitalmari has an average literacy rate of 37% (7+ years), and the national average is 32.4% literate. Chitalmari's religious composition is 60.45% Muslim, 39.35% Hindu, and 2% others.  Religious institutions include 184 mosques, 72 temples, and one church. Sacred places are Central Jami Mosque, Durgapur Temple. Boalia Durga Mandir and Panchapalli Sarbojnin Durga Mandir.  There was a Jamidari Kachharibari at Sabokhali.

Chitalmari consists of two mouzas with an area of 0.89 km2. It has a population of 973; male 53.55%, female 46.45%. The literacy rate among the town's people is 52.5%.

Chitalmari thana was turned into an upazila in 1983.

Economy
The majority of the population, 76%, is engaged in agriculture. There are 15,584 hectares of arable land, and 74% of the population owns property to some extent. The main crops grown include paddy, wheat, jute, and pulse, with fruits including mango, blackberry, papaya, watermelon, banana, coconut, guava and betel nut. The last three fruits are among the primary exports of the region, along with rice, vegetables and leather.

Other major occupations include commerce (11%), service (6%) and transport & communication (1%).

Administration
Chitalmari Upazila is divided into seven union parishads: Barabaria, Char Baniari, Chitalmari, Hizla, Santoshpur, Kalatala, and Shibpur. The union parishads are subdivided into 55 mauzas and 121 villages.

Infrastructure
There are many private hospitals and one 50-bed hospital. Educational institutions include three colleges (Sher-E-Bangla Degree College and Bangobondhu Women's College, Kalidas Baral Smriti Degree College), 26 high schools, 14 madrasas, 63 government primary schools and 45 non-government primary schools. Many high-ranking government officials have come from Chitalmari Upazila.

There is one public library, one cinema hall, 2 theatre groups, 123 rural clubs and 30 playgrounds.

References

 
Upazilas of Bagerhat District